Gouldtown may refer to a community in North America:

 Gouldtown, Saskatchewan, Canada
 Gouldtown, New Jersey, United States